Luigi Allemandi (8 November 1903 – 25 September 1978) was an Italian footballer who played as a defender, usually as a left back. He was a member of the Italy national team which won the 1934 World Cup.

Club career
Born in San Damiano Macra, province of Cuneo, Allemandi debuted in 1921 with A.C. Legnano. Later, he played with Juventus F.C., F.C. Internazionale Milano, A.S. Roma, S.S.C. Venezia and S.S. Lazio, and also had a successful international career with Italy. However, the part of his career that stands out is the corruption scandal in the Torino–Juventus derby in 1927 that resulted in Torino being stripped of their title.

According to the official account, a manager from Torino offered Allemandi 35 000 lira to throw the game, 25 000 immediately and the rest after the match. Torino won the match 2–1, but Allemandi was one of the best players in the field, and when he went to collect the rest of the money he was refused. A journalist found out about the match fixing and went public with the information. After a controversial trial, along with Torino's title revocation, Allemandi was banned for life even though he always self-proclaimed innocent. He was later pardoned by CONI in 1928 and joined Ambrosiana-Inter.

International career
After debuting for the Italy national team in 1925, Allemandi eventually won the left back position from Umberto Caligaris before their 1934 World Cup qualifying match against Greece. Manager Vittorio Pozzo started him in every match of the final tournament, helping the Azzurri win the title on home soil; he later served as Italy's captain between 1935 and 1936.
He is also one of 9 players being part of both the 1927–30 Central European International Cup, the 1931-32 Central European International Cup & the 1933–35 Central European International Cup successful campaigns.

Honours
Juventus
Prima Divisione: 1925–26

Ambrosiana-Inter
Serie A: 1929–30

International 
Italy
 FIFA World Cup: 1934
 Central European International Cup: 1927-30, 1933-35
 Central European International Cup: Runner-up: 1931-32

References

1903 births
1978 deaths
Sportspeople from the Province of Cuneo
Italian footballers
Italy international footballers
Serie A players
Serie B players
A.C. Legnano players
Juventus F.C. players
Inter Milan players
A.S. Roma players
Venezia F.C. players
S.S. Lazio players
1934 FIFA World Cup players
FIFA World Cup-winning players
S.S. Lazio managers
Association football defenders
Italian football managers
Footballers from Piedmont